Digital mapping (also called digital or computer cartography) is the process by which a collection of spatial data is compiled and formatted into a virtual image on a computer. The primary function of this technology is to produce maps that give accurate representations of a particular area, detailing major road arteries and other points of interest. The technology also allows the calculation of distances from one place to another.

Although digital mapping can be found in a variety of computer applications the main use of these maps is with the Global Positioning System, or GPS satellite network, used in standard automotive navigation systems.

History

From paper to paperless
The roots of digital mapping lie within traditional paper maps such as the Thomas Guide and Geographers' A–Z Street Atlas. Paper maps provide basic landscapes similar to digitized road maps, yet are often cumbersome, cover only a designated area, and lack many specific details such as road blocks. In addition, there is no way to “update” a paper map except to obtain a new version. On the other hand, digital maps, in many cases, can be updated through synchronization with updates from company servers.

Expanded capabilities
Early digital maps had the same basic functionality as paper maps—that is, they provided a “virtual view” of roads generally outlined by the terrain encompassing the surrounding area. However, as digital maps have grown with the expansion of GPS technology in the past decade, live traffic updates, points of interest and service locations have been added to enhance digital maps to be more “user conscious." Traditional “virtual views” are now only part of digital mapping. In many cases, users can choose between virtual maps, satellite (aerial views), and hybrid (a combination of virtual map and aerial views) views. With the ability to update and expand digital mapping devices, newly constructed roads and places can be added to appear on maps. Three-dimensional maps of landscapes can be generated using 3D scanners or 3D reconstruction software.

Data collection
Digital maps heavily rely upon a vast amount of data collected over time. Most of the information that comprise digital maps is the culmination of satellite imagery as well as street level information. Maps must be updated frequently to provide users with the most accurate reflection of a location. While there is a wide spectrum on companies that specialize in digital mapping, the basic premise is that digital maps will accurately portray roads as they actually appear to give "life-like experiences."

Functionality and Use

Computer applications
Proprietary and non-proprietary computer programs and applications provide imagery and street-level map data for much of the world.

Scientific applications
The development of mobile computing  (PDAs, tablet PCs, laptops, etc.) has recently (since about 2000) spurred the use of digital mapping in the sciences and  applied sciences. , science fields that use digital mapping technology include geology (see Digital geologic mapping), engineering, architecture,  land surveying, mining, forestry,  environmental, and archaeology.

GPS navigation systems
The principal use by which digital mapping has grown in the past decade has been its connection to Global Positioning System (GPS) technology. GPS is the foundation behind digital mapping navigation systems.

How it works 

The coordinates and position as well as atomic time obtained by a terrestrial GPS receiver from GPS satellites orbiting Earth interact together to provide the digital mapping programming with points of origin in addition to the destination points needed to calculate distance. This information is then analyzed and compiled to create a map that provides the easiest and most efficient way to reach a destination.
More technically speaking, the device operates in the following manner:
 GPS receivers collect data from at least four GPS satellites orbiting the Earth, calculating position in three dimensions.
 The GPS receiver then utilizes position to provide GPS coordinates, or exact points of latitudinal and longitudinal direction from GPS satellites.
 The points, or coordinates, output an accurate range between approximately "10-20 meters" of the actual location.
 The beginning point, entered via GPS coordinates, and the ending point, (address or coordinates) input by the user, are then entered into the digital mapping software.
 The mapping software outputs a real-time visual representation of the route. The map then moves along the path of the driver.
 If the driver drifts from the designated route, the navigation system will use the current coordinates to recalculate a route to the destination location.

See also
Cartography
Digital elevation model
Geographic information systems
Digital architecture
Digital geologic mapping
Simultaneous localization and mapping
Sound map

References

Digital mapping
Geodesy